Wirra Wirra railway station is a railway station in the Shire of Etheridge, Queensland, Australia. It is on the heritage-listed Etheridge railway line.

References

Railway stations in Queensland
Shire of Etheridge
Etheridge railway line
Buildings and structures in Far North Queensland